Huancayo Province is located in Peru. It is one of the 9 provinces composing the Junín Region. It borders to the north with the Concepción Province, the east with the Satipo Province, the south with the Huancavelica Region and the west with the Chupaca Province. The province has an approximate population of 545,615 inhabitants. The capital of the province is the city of Huancayo.

Geography 
The Chunta mountain range and the Waytapallana mountain range traverse the province. Some of the highest peaks of the province are  listed below:

Some of the largest lakes of the Huancayo Province are Aqchiqucha,  Hatunqucha, Quylluqucha, Walsaqucha, Wich'iqucha, Yuraqqucha and Ñawinqucha.

Political division 
The province is divided into 28 districts over an area of 4 711,15 km². These districts are:

See also 
 Ankap Wachanan
 Apu Inka
 Wari Willka

External links
  Municipal website

Footnotes

Provinces of the Junín Region